The following is a list of episodes from the inaugural season of ALF. Most episode titles are named after popular songs.

Broadcast history
Season One aired Mondays at 8:00-8:30 pm (EST) on NBC.

DVD release
The season was released on DVD by Lionsgate Home Entertainment.

Cast
 Paul Fusco as ALF (puppeteer, voice)
 Lisa Buckley as ALF (assistant puppeteer)
 Bob Fappiano as ALF (assistant puppeteer)
 Max Wright as Willie Tanner
 Anne Schedeen as Kate Tanner
 Andrea Elson as Lynn Tanner
 Benji Gregory as Brian Tanner

Episodes

References

ALF (TV series) seasons
1986 American television seasons
1987 American television seasons